Abbas-e Sharqi Rural District is in Tekmeh Dash District of Bostanabad County, East Azerbaijan province, Iran. At the census of 2006, its population was 3,056 in 770 households; there were 2,197 inhabitants in 727 households at the following census of 2011; and in the most recent census of 2016, the population of the rural district was 1,798 in 697 households. The largest of its 26 villages was Shangolabad, with 316 people.

References 

Bostanabad County

Rural Districts of East Azerbaijan Province

Populated places in East Azerbaijan Province

Populated places in Bostanabad County